The Diva Station is a mix of instrumental rock music with three songs with vocals. Former Gamma vocalist Davey Pattison reunites for two songs with Ronnie Montrose.

Track listing 
 "Sorcerer" (Ronnie Montrose) 6:24
 "The Diva Station" (Montrose, Davey Pattison) 4:32
 "Weirding Way" (Aynsley Dunbar, Davey Faragher, Montrose) 3:50
 "New Kid in Town" (Montrose) 4:53
 "Choke Canyon" (Dunbar, Faragher, Montrose) 3:31
 "Little Demons" (Montrose) 5:20
 "Stay With Me"  (Jerry Ragovoy, George David Weiss) 4:24 - Lorraine Ellison cover
 "Quid Pro Quo" (Montrose) 3:55
 "High and Dry" (Montrose) 4:45
 "Solitaire" (Montrose) 2:12

Personnel
Ronnie Montrose – Electric guitar, Acoustic guitar, Mandocello, Vocal effects
Davey Pattison: Vocals on "The Diva Station" and "Stay With Me"
Boris – Electric bass guitar and Vocals on "New Kid in Town"
Davey Faragher– Electric bass guitar
Aynsley Dunbar – Acoustic drums
Steve Bellino - Acoustic drums on "New Kid in Town" and "Weirding Way"
Gary Hull - Keyboards

Production
Produced by Ronnie Montrose
Engineered by Ronnie Montrose and Roger Wiersema

References
Ronnie Montrose; "The Diva Station" liner notes; Enigma Records 1990
All Music Guide [}]

1990 albums
Ronnie Montrose albums
Enigma Records